Jarvis is a given name and English surname that derives from the personal name Gervase, the element geri meaning "spear". Other spellings of the name include Jervis, Jervoise, and Gervis.

Surname
 Adrian Jarvis, rugby fly-half
 Affie Jarvis (1860–1933), Australian Test cricketer
 Al Jarvis, L.A. radio DJ; created "The World's Largest Make Believe Ballroom" music show in early 1930s.
 Andrew Jarvis, American politician and restaurateur.
 Ann Jarvis (1832–1905), social activist, founder of Mother's Day holiday in the US
 Anna Jarvis (1864–1948), daughter of Ann Jarvis
 Chris Jarvis, several people including:
 Chris Jarvis (actor), British actor
 Chris Jarvis (presenter), British presenter of children's television programmes
 Chris Jarvis (rower), Canadian Olympic rower
 Cosmo Jarvis, English singer-songwriter, musician, actor and filmmaker
 D. C. Jarvis (1881–1966), American physician from Vermont
 Dan Jarvis, British Labour MP, born 1972 in Nottingham
 Dave Jarvis, American college baseball coach
 David H. Jarvis (1862–1911), captain in the United States Revenue Cutter Service
 Doug Jarvis, ice hockey forward
 Ene Järvis, Estonian actress 
 Eugene Jarvis, game designer and programmer
 Francis Jarvis, rugby league footballer
 Frank Jarvis, athlete
 Fred Jarvis, retired British trade union leader
 Graham Jarvis, actor
 Gregory Jarvis (1944–1986), American astronaut killed aboard the Space Shuttle Challenger
George Jarvis (Philhellene), American philhellene
 Harwood Jarvis (1884–1936), Australian cricketer
 Howard Jarvis (1903–1986), American businessman, lobbyist, and politician; tax-revolt leader in California
 James C. Jarvis, for whom the USS Jarvis series of three ships were named 
 Jeff Jarvis, American journalist
 John Jarvis, several people including:
 John Arthur Jarvis (1872–1933), swimmer
 John Wesley Jarvis (1781–1839), American painter
 Kevin Jarvis, baseball player
 Lewis Jarvis (1857–1938), British banker and cricketer
 Lyndall Jarvis, South African model
 Martin Jarvis, several people including:
 Martin Jarvis (actor), English actor
 Martin Jarvis (conductor), Australian conductor 
 Matt Jarvis, English international footballer
 Mike Jarvis, men's basketball coach
 Nathaniel Jarvis, Welsh footballer
 Oliver Jarvis, British racing car driver
 Pat Jarvis several people including:
 Pat Jarvis (baseball), Major League Baseball player
 Pat Jarvis (rugby league), Australian rugby league footballer
 Paul Jarvis, English cricketer
 Peter Jarvis, American musician
 Piret Järvis, Estonian musician
 Ralph Jarvis (born 1965), American player of gridiron football
 Rebecca Jarvis, American financial journalist and former reality show contestant on The Apprentice
 Richard Jarvis (American football) (born 1995), American football player
 Robert Jarvis (disambiguation)
 Robin Jarvis, novelist
 Roland Jarvis, fictional character and leader of the faction Enlightened in Ingress (game), an augmented reality game
 Rossi Jarvis, English footballer
 Ryan Jarvis, English footballer
 Samuel Jarvis (1792–1857), Chief Superintendent of Indian Affairs for Upper Canada
 Seth Jarvis (born 2002), Canadian ice hockey player
 Sid Jarvis (1905–1994), English footballer
 Thomas Jordan Jarvis, US State Governor of North Carolina
 William Jarvis several people including:
 William Jarvis (merchant) (1770–1859), merchant, American diplomat and sheep rancher
 William Botsford Jarvis (1799–1864), Upper Canada political figure associated with the Rosedale and Yorkville neighbourhoods of Toronto
 William H. Jarvis (1930–2016), former member of the Canadian House of Commons

Given name
 Jarvis Astaire, British sports executive, former boxing promoter, and film producer
 Jarvis Blinn (1836–1862), Captain of 14th Connecticut Regiment Infantry's B Company
 Jarvis Brown, Major League Baseball outfielder
 Jarvis Cocker, English singer-songwriter and frontman for the band Pulp
 Jarvis Giles, American football running back
 Jarvis Green, American football defensive end
 Jarvis Hayes, American professional basketball player
 Jarvis Hunt, American architect
 Jarvis Jenkins, American football defensive end
 Jarvis Johnson, elected official currently holding office as a District Council Member in the city of Houston, Texas District B
 Jarvis Jones, American football linebacker
 Jarvis Kenrick, English association football (soccer) player
 Jarvis Landry, American football wide receiver
 Jarvis Lang, American professional basketball player
 Jarvis Lord (1816–1887), American politician from New York
 Jarvis Lorry, fictional character in A Tale of Two Cities
 Jarvis Lynch, Major General in the U.S. Marine Corps
 Jarvis Moss, American football defensive end
 Jarvis Offutt (1894–1918), aviator from Omaha, Nebraska, who died in World War I
 Jarvis W. Pike (1795–1854), first mayor of Columbus, Ohio
 Jarvis Redwine, American college and professional football player
 Jarvis Tatum, Major League Baseball center fielder
 Jarvis Tyner, American politician
 Jarvis Varnado, college basketball player
 Jarvis Williams (defensive back), American football safety
 Jarvis Williams (wide receiver), American football wide receiver
 Jarvis T. Wright (1830–1886), American businessman and politician

References

See also
 Järvis (surname)
 Javitz (surname)

Surnames
English-language surnames